FICE may refer to:

 Federal Interagency Committee on Education, a committee of the United States Department of Education
 Fellow of the Institution of Civil Engineers
 Foreign-Invested Commercial Enterprise, a variant of Wholly Foreign Owned Enterprise
 Fuji Intelligent Colour Enhancement, a technique of virtual chromoendoscopy in medicine
 Fice, early spelling of "feist": See Feist (dog)
 Federated Institutes of Cultural Enrichment, a coalition of African American artists active in late-1960s Brooklyn